Ricardo Miranda  (born August 22, 1976) is a Canadian politician and trade unionist who was elected to the Legislative Assembly of Alberta in the 2015 Alberta general election representing the electoral district of Calgary-Cross.

On February 2, 2016, Miranda was appointed Alberta's Minister of Culture and Tourism.

Before Politics
In 1988, Miranda left war-torn Nicaragua immigrating to Canada as a refugee when he was just 10-years-old. He graduated from Father Lacombe High School in Calgary, and went on to complete a Bachelor of Arts degree from the University of Calgary.

Miranda engaged for several years in activism for various workers' rights organizations. While employed as a flight attendant for Air Canada, he was elected president of his local union, one of the largest within the Canadian Union of Public Employees. He went on to work for CUPE as a researcher in the Alberta office of CUPE National, where he met and worked with Louis Arab, husband of the incumbent premier and Alberta NDP leader the Hon. Rachel Notley.  As a CUPE researcher, Miranda also contributed to public policy as a board member of the Parkland Institute, an Edmonton-based public policy think tank based in the Faculty of Arts at the University of Alberta.

Political career
Miranda's entry into politics came after encouragement by Alberta NDP leader Rachel Notley, who suggested he may run for the Alberta NDP party. Previously, Miranda had served as a member of various committees, including the Standing Committee on the Alberta Heritage Savings Trust Fund and the Select Special Ethics and Accountability Committee.  He also served as chair of the Standing Committee on Alberta's Economic Future.

He was elected as an MLA in the 2015 Alberta general election, becoming one of the first three openly LGBT politicians elected to the provincial legislature, alongside caucus colleagues Michael Connolly and Estefania Cortes-Vargas. In February 2016, Miranda was appointed as Alberta's Minister of Culture and Tourism in a provincial government headed by Notley.

He was defeated in the 2019 provincial election.

Personal life
Miranda is openly gay. In addition to belonging to a sexual minority group, Miranda has variously spoken publicly about the difficulties of his early life fleeing war and persecution, and has been the voice of Judaism in the legislature, rising to inform on the occasion of various Jewish holidays.

Miranda became Alberta's first cabinet minister to be married in a same-sex wedding. In a marriage ceremony held on December 28, 2018 in Calgary's Glenbow Museum, Miranda married boyfriend and partner Christopher Brown. He had met Brown early in 2018. The marriage ceremony of Miranda and Brown was officiated by Alberta Premier Rachel Notley.

Electoral history

References

1976 births
Living people
Alberta New Democratic Party MLAs
Canadian LGBT people in provincial and territorial legislatures
Gay politicians
Members of the Executive Council of Alberta
Politicians from Calgary
University of Calgary alumni
People from Managua
Nicaraguan emigrants to Canada
Nicaraguan Jews
21st-century Canadian politicians
Jewish Canadian politicians
21st-century Canadian LGBT people
Canadian gay men